Bharatendu Harishchandra (9 September 18506 January 1885) was an Indian poet, writer and playwright. He authored several dramas, life sketches and travel accounts, using new media such as reports, publications, letters to editors of publications, translations, and literary works to shape public opinion. He has been hailed as a Yug Charan for his writings depicting the exploitative nature of the British Raj.

Writing under the pen name "Rasa", Harishchandra picked themes that demonstrated the agonies of the people. For instance, the country's poverty, dependency, inhuman exploitation, the unrest of the middle class and the urgent need for progression of the country. Referred as a fearless journalist, Harishchandra refuted the prevailing orthodoxy of the time and revealed the machination of the mahants, pandas and priests. He was an influential Hindu "traditionalist", using Vaishnava devotionalism to define a coherent Hindu religion.

'Bharatendu Harishchandra' is often considered the father of Hindi literature and Hindi theatre.

Biography 
Born into the Agrawal caste in Benaras, Harishchandra's father Gopal Chandra was a poet. His ancestors were landlords in Bengal. Even though his parents died when he was young, they seemed to have left an influence on him. Acharya Ramchandra Shukla has described Bharatendu's journey to the Jagannath temple in Puri, Orissa with his family in 1865, at the young age of 15. During this trip he was deeply moved by the Bengal Renaissance and decided to bring the genres of social, historical, and Puranic plays and novels into Hindi. This influence reflected in his Hindi translation of the Bengali drama Vidyasundar, three years later, in 1868.

Harishchandra edited the magazines Kavi Vachan Sudha, Harishchandra Magazine, Harishchandra Patrika and Bal Vodhini.

He wrote under the pseudonym Girdhar Das. He was titled "Bharatendu" ("The moon of India") at a public meeting by scholars of Kashi in 1880 in recognition of his services as a writer, patron, and moderniser. Ram Vilas Sharma refers to the "great literary awakening ushered in under Bharatendu's leadership" as the "second storey of the edifice of renascent Hindi", the first being the Indian Rebellion of 1857.

He was married and had one daughter.

Hindu traditionalism 
According to Barbara and Thomas R. Metcalf, Bharatendu Harishchandra was a powerful Hindu "traditionalist" in North India, promoting the continuity of received tradition and self-conscious participation with the modern world. He rejected the authority of those engaged with Western learning and institutions over Hindu religious matters and recommended they be left to traditionally educated Hindu Brahmans. He used new media, especially publications to shape public opinion. In doing so, he contributed to the development of modern forms of the Hindi language. 

He used Vaishnava devotionalism to define a coherent Hindu religion, using the Kashi Dharma Sabha as his institutional base, started in the 1860s by the Maharaja of Benares as a response to more radical Hindu reformist movements. Harishchandra insisted on the value of image worship and interpreted Bhakti as devotion to a single god; this was in response to Orientalist and Christian critiques of Hinduism.

Although Urdu was used as the lingua franca across North India since the 18th Century, Harishchandra espoused the cause of reviving Hindi as part of his cultural and nationalist activities. He "combined pleas for [the] use of Swadeshi articles with demands for replacement of Urdu by Hindi in courts and a ban on cow slaughter". He continued his campaign for a legal ban on cow slaughter on behalf of Maharaja of Benares, taking it to the Delhi Durbar. His petition on the same, according to Sahay ([1905] 1975: 84), had 60,000 signatories and was submitted to Lord Lytton. Even though no action was taken on the ban, he was given the title "Vir Vaishnava".

Major works

Plays 
Bharatendu Harishchandra soon became a director, manager, and playwright. He used theatre as a tool to shape public opinion. His major plays are:

 Vaidika Himsa Na Bhavati, 1873 (वैदिक हिंसा हिंसा न भवति)
 Satya Harishchandra, 1876 (सत्य हरिश्चन्द्र)
 Bharat Durdasha, 1875
 Niladevi, 1881 (नीलदेवी)
 Andher Nagari (अन्धेर नगरी, City of Darkness), 1881: A popular play of modern Hindi drama and a political satire. Translated and performed in many Indian languages by prominent Indian directors like B. V. Karanth, Prasanna, Arvind Gaur and Sanjay Upadhyaya.

Poetry
 Bhakta Sarvagya (भक्त सर्वज्ञ)
 Prem Malika (प्रेम मालिका), 1872
 Prem Madhuri (प्रेम माधुरी), 1875
 Prem Tarang (प्रेम तरंग),1877
 Prem Prakalpa (प्रेम प्रकल्प), Prem Phulwari (प्रेम फुलवारी) and Prem Sarowar (प्रेम सरोवर), 1883
 Holi (होली), (1874)
 Madhumukul (मधुमुकुल), 1881
 Raga Sangrah (राग संग्रह), 1880
 Varsha Vinod (वर्षा विनोद), 1880
 Vinay Prem Pachasa (विनय प्रेम पचासा), 1881
 Phulon Ka Guchchha (फूलों का गुच्छा), 1882
 Chandravali (चन्द्रावली), 1876 and Krishnacharitra (कृष्णचरित्र), 1883
 Uttarardha Bhaktamal (उत्तरार्द्ध भक्तमाल), 1876–77

निज भाषा उन्नति अहै, सब उन्नति को मूल ।
बिन निज भाषा-ज्ञान के, मिटत न हिय को सूल ।।

विविध कला शिक्षा अमित, ज्ञान अनेक प्रकार।
सब देसन से लै करहू, भाषा माहि प्रचार ।।

Translation:
Progress is made in one's own language (the mother tongue), as it the foundation of all progress.
Without the knowledge of the mother tongue, there is no cure for the pain of heart.
Many arts and education infinite, knowledge of various kinds. Should be taken from all countries, but be propagated in one's mother tongue.

Translations

 Harsha's Ratnavali (रत्नावली)
 Vishakhadatta's Mudrarakshasa (मुद्राराक्षस)
 Ramprasad Sen's Vidyasundar (विद्यासुन्दर) from Bengali
 Karpuramanjari (कर्पूरमञ्जरी) from Prakrit
 Shakespeare's Merchant of Venice as Durlabh Bandhu (दुर्लभ बन्धु) Invaluable Friend

Essay collection

 Bharatendu Granthavali (भारतेन्दु ग्रन्थावली), 1885

Bharatendu Harishchandra Awards 
The Ministry of Information and Broadcasting of India gives the Bharatendu Harishchandra Awards since 1983 to promote original writings in Hindi mass communication.

See also 
 Bharatendu Natya Academy
 Moti Chandra

References

External links 
 
 

 Bharatendu Harishchandra at Kavita Kosh (Hindi)
 Plays of Bharatendu Harishchandra at Gadya Kosh
 Poetry by Bharatendu

1850 births
1885 deaths
Writers from Varanasi
Hindi dramatists and playwrights
Hindi journalists
Hindi-language poets
Hindi theatre
Indian magazine editors
Indian male novelists
Indian male stage actors
Indian theatre directors
Indian male journalists
Poets from Uttar Pradesh
19th-century Indian journalists
19th-century Indian poets
19th-century Indian novelists
19th-century Indian dramatists and playwrights
Indian male dramatists and playwrights
19th-century Indian male actors
Indian male poets
19th-century Indian male writers
Journalists from Uttar Pradesh
Dramatists and playwrights from Uttar Pradesh